A mourning ring is a finger ring worn in memory of someone who has died.  It often bears the name and date of death of the person, and possibly an image of them, or a motto. They were usually paid for by the person commemorated, or their heirs, and often specified, along with the list of intended recipients, in wills.  Stones mounted on the rings were usually black, and where it could be afforded jet was the preferred option. Otherwise cheaper black materials such as  black enamel or vulcanite were used. White enamel was used on occasion particularly where the deceased was a child. It also saw some use when the person being mourned had not married. In some cases a lock of hair of the deceased person would be incorporated into the ring. The use of hair in mourning rings was not as widespread as it might have been due to concerns that the hair of the deceased would be substituted with other hair.

The use of mourning rings dates back to at least the 14th century, although it is only in the 17th century that they clearly separated from more general Memento mori rings. By the mid-18th century jewelers had started to advertise the speed with which such rings could be made. The style largely settled upon was a single small stone with details of the decedent recorded in enamel on the hoop. In the latter half of the 19th century the style shifted towards mass produced rings featuring a photograph mounted on the bezel before the use of mourning rings largely ceased towards the end of the century.

Use of mourning rings resurfaced in the 1930s and 1940s in the United States. The rings were made of bakelite and mounted a small picture of the person being mourned.

Mourning rings have sometimes been made to mark occasions other than a person's death. In 1793 one was made for William Skirving after he was sentenced to penal transportation.

People who bequeathed mourning rings 

 
Cesar Picton, d. 1836, bequeathing 16 rings
Sir Anthony Browne
Col. Nicholas Spencer
William Shakespeare (mourning rings mentioned in Shakespeare's will)
Princess Amelia of the United Kingdom

References

Rings (jewellery)
Death customs